Drop-dead is the ninth full-length studio album of the band The Violet Burning. It was released February 14, 2006 on Northern Records.

Track listing
All tracks by Michael J. Pritzl

 "Human" – 5:17 
 "All I Want" – 4:02 
 "Do You Love Me?" – 3:26 
 "Already Gone" – 3:55
 "More" – 5:40
 "Swan Sea" – 3:50
 "Eleanor" – 3:42
 "Rewind" – 3:41
 "Blown Away" – 4:10
 "Trans" – 0:41 
 "The End Begins" – 7:00 
 "One Thousand Years" – 6:46

Personnel
 Michael J. Pritzl - vocals
 Lenny Beh - drums
 Chris Buelow - guitar
 Daryl 'Black Cherry' Dawson - bass

References

2006 albums
The Violet Burning albums